Viktória Egri (born 18 January 1998) is a Hungarian shooter. She represented her country at the 2016 Summer Olympics in the women's 10m air pistol event. She finished 36th out of 44 shooters.

References 

1998 births
Living people
Hungarian female sport shooters
Shooters at the 2016 Summer Olympics
Olympic shooters of Hungary
European Games competitors for Hungary
Shooters at the 2019 European Games
21st-century Hungarian women